Tsatsa is a rural locality (a selo) in Svetloyarsky District, Volgograd Oblast, Russia. The population was 1,551 as of 2010. There are 11 streets.

Geography 
Tsatsa is located 46 km southwest of Svetly Yar (the district's administrative centre) by road. Novosad is the nearest rural locality.

References 

Rural localities in Svetloyarsky District